Adony Subregion was a subregion in Fejér County, Hungary. Seat of the subregion was in Adony.

Settlements

Subregions of Hungary